Salt equivalent is usually quoted on food nutrition information tables on food labels, and is a different way of defining sodium intake, noting that salt is chemically sodium chloride.

To convert from sodium to the approximate salt equivalent, multiply sodium content by 2.5:

(see: atomic mass and molecular mass).

Sources
 British Nutrition Foundation article on salt

Further reading 
 

Nutrition
Equivalent units